Angus Edghill (born 15 February 1946) is a Barbadian former swimmer. He competed in two events at the 1968 Summer Olympics.

References

1946 births
Living people
British emigrants to Barbados
Barbadian male swimmers
Olympic swimmers of Barbados
Swimmers at the 1968 Summer Olympics
Place of birth missing (living people)